Możdżany  is a village in the administrative district of Gmina Kruklanki, within Giżycko County, Warmian-Masurian Voivodeship, in northern Poland.

The village has an approximate population of 202.

Notable residents
 Dieter Wisliceny (1911–1948), German Nazi SS officer and perpetrator of the Holocaust executed for war crimes
 Günther-Eberhardt Wisliceny (1912-1985), SS officer

References

Villages in Giżycko County